The Hamilton Parks Police Force was a special constable force, formed in 1943 to patrol parks within the City of Hamilton, Ontario.

By 1955, the Hamilton Board of Parks Management was considering disbanding the force, but ultimately did not as it would cost too much to contract the city police.

Originally only three special constables were employed by the Hamilton Parks Police, but by 1960 a fourth was added.  The duties of the parks police were defined as keeping order in the parks, but not to solving crimes, which was left to the Hamilton Police Force, who would also provide backup to the special constables if needed.  By 1963, the parks police had expanded to a six-man force.

On June 28, 1963, the Hamilton Board of Parks Management disbanded the parks police following a dispute over, amongst other things, higher pay and bargaining rights. The six former special constables became "parks custodians".

Later the Hamilton Police Force continued the policing of parks by dedicating officers to that specific job during the summer months from May to September. This unit was known as the "Parks Patrol" and was generally were staffed by plainclothes officers.

References

1. Clipping Files. Hamilton - Parks - Parks Police. Local History & Archives, HPL.

2. Hamilton Police Department Scrapbook. vol. 9. p. 37. Local History & Archives, HPL.

3. Steel Shots. August 23, 1963. p. 5.

External links
My Hamilton.ca

Organizations based in Hamilton, Ontario
Law enforcement agencies of Ontario
Defunct law enforcement agencies of Canada